A constitutional referendum was held in the Republic of Dahomey on 31 March 1968. As with the 1964 referendum, the main issues were changing the system of government to a presidential system, scrapping term limits for the president, and having a unicameral parliament. The referendum passed with 92.2% of voters approving the changes. Turnout was 81.8% of the 1,126,155 registered voters.

Results

References

1968 referendums
1968
1968 in the Republic of Dahomey
Constitutional referendums